Nirmaan is a 1974 Bollywood drama film directed by Ravi Tandon. The film stars Navin Nischol and Anupama in lead roles.

Cast
Navin Nischol as Navin
Anupama as Anu
Bindu as Susheela
Rehman as Shyamlal

Soundtrack
All songs were penned by Majrooh Sultanpuri.

References

External links
 

1974 films
1970s Hindi-language films
1974 drama films
Films scored by Laxmikant–Pyarelal
Films directed by Ravi Tandon